Communauté d'agglomération Quimper Bretagne Occidentale is an intercommunal structure, centred on the city of Quimper. It is located in the Finistère department, in the Brittany region, western France. It was created in January 2017. Its seat is in Quimper. Its area is 479.4 km2. Its population was 100,196 in 2017, of which 62,985 in Quimper proper.

Composition
The communauté d'agglomération consists of the following 14 communes:

Briec
Edern
Ergué-Gabéric
Guengat
Landrévarzec
Landudal
Langolen
Locronan
Plogonnec
Plomelin
Plonéis
Pluguffan
Quéménéven
Quimper

References

Quimper
Quimper